Chris Evert was the defending champion and won in the final 6–0, 6–4 against Martina Navratilova.

Seeds
A champion seed is indicated in bold text while text in italics indicates the round in which that seed was eliminated.

  Martina Navratilova (final)
  Chris Evert (champion)
  Lori McNeil (first round)
  Zina Garrison (semifinals)
  Arantxa Sánchez (quarterfinals)
  Isabel Cueto (quarterfinals)
  Patricia Tarabini (quarterfinals)
  Rosalyn Fairbank (first round)

Draw

External links
 ITF tournament edition details
 Tournament draws

Virginia Slims of Houston
1988 WTA Tour